BAT99-98 is a star in the Large Magellanic Cloud. It is located near the R136 cluster in the 30 Doradus nebula. At  and  it is one of the most massive and luminous stars known.

Observations
A 1978 survey carried out by J. Melnick covered the 30 Doradus region and found six new W-R stars, all belonging to the WN sequence. The survey observed stars that were above magnitude 14 and that were within two arcminutes of the centre of the 30 Doradus nebula, and BAT99-98 was labelled as star J. It was found to have an apparent magnitude of 13.5 and a spectral type of WN-5.

The following year, 13 new Wolf Rayet stars in the LMC were reported, one of which was Mel J.  It was numbered 12, referred to as AB 12, or LMC AB 12 to distinguish it from the better-known SMC AB stars.

Melnick conducted another study of stars in NGC 2070 and gave BAT99-98 the number 49, referred to as Melnick 49, this time giving the spectral type WN7.

Neither the AB12 nor Mel J designations are in common use, although Melnick 49 is sometimes seen.  More commonly, LMC Wolf Rayet stars are referred to by R (Radcliffe Observatory) numbers, Brey (Breysacher catalogue) numbers, or BAT99 numbers.

Characteristics
The star is located near the R136 cluster and shares similar mass-luminosity properties to the massive stars in R136. It is estimated that at its birth that the star held  and has since lost . Although the star is very luminous due to its high temperature, much of that light is ultraviolet and invisible to humans - it is only 141,000 times brighter than the sun visually. It is classified as a WN6 star and models suggest that it is 7.5 million years old.

Fate
The future of BAT99-98 depends on its mass loss. It is thought that stars this massive will never lose enough mass to avoid a catastrophic end.  The result is likely to be a supernova, hypernova, gamma-ray burst, or perhaps almost no visible explosion, and leaving behind a black hole or neutron star.  The exact details depend heavily on the timing and amount of the mass loss, with current models not fully reproducing observed stars, but the most massive stars in the local universe are expected to produce type Ib or Ic supernovae, sometimes with a gamma-ray burst, and leave behind a black hole. However, such massive stars are expected to end in pair-instability supernovae and leave behind no remnant at all.

See also

 List of most massive stars
 List of most luminous stars
 Lynx Arc

References

Stars in the Large Magellanic Cloud
Tarantula Nebula
Extragalactic stars
Wolf–Rayet stars
Dorado (constellation)
?
J05383914-6906211
Large Magellanic Cloud